StatCVS is an open source program written in Java that generates graphical reports about CVS modules. It reveals, for example, which developer has made the most check-ins to the repository, and plots the development of the lines of code (LOC) of the entire module and individual folders over time.

StatCVS uses JFreeChart to generate charts. It is licensed under the GNU General Public License.

StatSVN is an extension to StatCVS that generates the same reports but for the activity of a Subversion repository.

External links 
 Official homepage
 example report
 StatSVN Official homepage
 StatSVN SourceForge page

Free software programmed in Java (programming language)
Free statistical software